The 2009 AMP Energy 500 was the 33rd race of the 2009 NASCAR Sprint Cup season and the seventh event of the Chase for the Sprint Cup.

Summary
It was held on November 1, 2009, at Talladega Superspeedway in Talladega, Alabama, and is the only race in the Championship Chase to utilize restrictor plates.  This marks the first time the race was run in an early November spot, the slot formerly occupied by the Atlanta Motor Speedway event. Jamie McMurray won the race, his first since Daytona in 2007. The last 15 laps of the race were a duel between McMurray and David Stremme, who had never had a top-five in Sprint Cup competition. Stremme ended up 22nd after running out of fuel. Nationwide Series regular Robert Richardson Jr. made his first Cup start and finished 18th.

Qualifying
Because qualifying was rained out, the rules awarded points leader Jimmie Johnson the pole position.

Single-file racing
NASCAR told the drivers in the drivers meeting  that they could not bump draft in the corners. That was followed by a controversial race where drivers drove in a single file line all the way around the track for a few segments. Many fans believed and still believe that that was a protest by the drivers to the new rule. Jimmie Johnson and Jamie McMurray all defended their actions. Johnson responded by saying, "No, there's not truth to that. When we hit single-file like that, we just know there's no need to race at that point. All that matters is from that last pit stop on." Instead of deciding to wreck and dwindle down the field on Sunday, Johnson said the drivers finally got smart about how to approach the race.  Everyone seemed to realize that you can't win if you aren't around at the end.

McMurray, the eventual race winner, said, "It wasn't like everybody was in their cars and we were like, 'Let's get single-file and prove a point' or 'Let's just follow each other.' You had to be in the outside groove because that's where all the momentum was."
This continued with Casey Mears leading the line for many laps until the first round of green flag pit stops started.

Race ends under caution
With five laps to go, Ryan Newman's car flipped on the back straightaway, landing on Kevin Harvick, and also collecting Marcos Ambrose and Elliott Sadler. The race was briefly red-flagged as debris was cleaned up and paramedics cut Newman from his car. Newman was uninjured. After a green-white-checkered restart, a big wreck happened with two laps to go, causing Kurt Busch, Scott Speed, Mark Martin, Jeff Gordon and Robby Gordon to crash; Martin's car blew over, but landed back on its wheels. The race ended under the caution flag and McMurray was scored as winner.

Top 20 finishers

 Jamie McMurray
 Kasey Kahne
 Joey Logano
 Greg Biffle
 Jeff Burton
 Jimmie Johnson
 Michael Waltrip
 Brad Keselowski
 Elliott Sadler
 Bobby Labonte
 Dale Earnhardt Jr.
 Clint Bowyer
 Brian Vickers
 Carl Edwards
 Kyle Busch
 Reed Sorenson
 David Ragan
 Robert Richardson Jr.
 Juan Pablo Montoya
 Jeff Gordon

References

AMP Energy 500
AMP Energy 500
NASCAR races at Talladega Superspeedway
November 2009 sports events in the United States